Antti Pohja (born 11 January 1977, Lahti) is a retired Finnish footballer. His position is forward. Pohja represents Tampere United playing in Finnish premier league Veikkausliiga. He returned to the club for the season 2007 having represented the club earlier in 2000–2001 and 2004. Pohja won the Finnish championship playing for Tampere United in 2001 and he was the top scorer of Veikkausliiga in 2004 when he scored 16 goals. Besides playing in Finland, he has represented Hammarby IF in Sweden and FC Vaduz in Liechtenstein.

On 9 September 2010 he announced that he will retire from the game after the 2010 season.

He has also played 19 international caps for Finland scoring two goals.

References

 Guardian Football
When a journalist had asked him in a press conference about his skills for next game against Azerbaidzan, Pohja answered knowing very clearly his skill level: "I am fast enough," before world cup qualifications match in fall 2008.

Finnish footballers
Finland international footballers
Sportspeople from Lahti
Veikkausliiga players
Allsvenskan players
Swiss Challenge League players
Hammarby Fotboll players
Tampere United players
Myllykosken Pallo −47 players
FC Jokerit players
Vaasan Palloseura players
Helsingin Jalkapalloklubi players
FC Vaduz players
Finnish expatriate footballers
Finnish expatriate sportspeople in Sweden
Expatriate footballers in Sweden
Finnish expatriate sportspeople in Liechtenstein
Expatriate footballers in Liechtenstein
1977 births
Living people
FinnPa players
Association football forwards
Association football midfielders